The Oriel and Laing Professor of the Interpretation of Holy Scripture (until 1991 the Oriel Professor of the Interpretation of Holy Scripture) is a chair in theology, particular Old Testament studies, at the University of Oxford. Oriel College, Oxford, decided in 1876 to establish a chair in theology, funded by the revenue from a canonry at Rochester Cathedral controlled by the college. The first professor, John Wordsworth, was appointed in 1883.  The chair was renamed in 1991 to mark a donation from the Laing Foundation that secured its endowment. The professorship carries with it a fellowship of Oriel College.

List of holders

John Wordsworth 1883–85
Thomas Kelly Cheyne 1885–1908
George Albert Cooke 1908–14
Charles Fox Burney 1914–25
David Capell Simpson 1925–50
Hedley Sparks 1952–76
James Barr 1976–78
Ernest Nicholson 1979–90
John Barton 1991–2014 (now Emeritus Professor)
Hindy Najman 2015–present

References

 Oriel and Laing Professor of the Interpretation of Holy Scripture, University of Oxford (2014)

Interpretation of Holy Scripture, Oriel and Laing
Interpretation of Holy Scripture, Oriel and Laing
Oriel College, Oxford
Lists of people associated with the University of Oxford
1883 establishments in the United Kingdom